Room 101 is a BBC comedy television series based on the radio series of the same name, in which celebrities are invited to discuss their pet hates and persuade the host to consign those hates to oblivion in Room 101, a location whose name was inspired by the torture room in George Orwell's 1949 novel Nineteen Eighty-Four which reputedly contained "the worst thing in the world". Orwell himself named it after a meeting room in Broadcasting House where he would sit through tedious meetings. It was produced independently for the BBC by Hat Trick Productions.

Nick Hancock hosted the first three series of the show from 1994 until 1997.  He was succeeded by Paul Merton, who hosted the show from 1999 till the show's original run came to an end in 2007. Frank Skinner hosts the revamped incarnation that started on 20 January 2012.

The 1994–2007 incarnation of the show was that of a one-on-one interview between the host and guest. Consignment of the nominated items, persons or concepts to Room 101 (theoretically banishing them from the world forever) was the decision of the host, sometimes after soliciting the opinion of the studio audience. The 2012 revamp introduced a panel format with three guests competing to have their pet hates consigned to Room 101, a decision made by the host. Guests included Ricky Gervais, Spike Milligan, Stephen Fry, Boris Johnson, Ben Miller and Ian Hislop (the only person to appear twice on the show in its original format). Fry went as far as to put Room 101 itself into Room 101.

A Dutch version of Room 101 started on 24 February 2008, but was short-lived. An Israeli version of the show was broadcast between 2010 and 2013. An Australian version of the show hosted by Paul McDermott began in 2015.

History
The radio series was originally broadcast on BBC Radio 5 in 1992, where it was hosted by Nick Hancock. Hancock was also the first presenter when the series transferred to television two years later. The first ever guest on the TV version was comedian Bob Monkhouse who cast the French into Room 101.

In 1999, Hancock was replaced as host by Paul Merton (who was also the first ever guest on the original radio version). Merton's first guest was Nick Hancock and his last was his fellow regular team captain on Have I Got News for You, Ian Hislop. Usually, there were five nominations discussed in each show – represented by several surreal props. The last item usually goes in, sometimes for a forfeit.

Following Merton's departure in 2007, it was announced that a replacement would be sought; however, it was not until 2012 that a twelfth series, now fronted by Frank Skinner, was aired.

In July, 2018, Skinner announced that, after 24 years, the show had been cancelled by the BBC.

The show is planned to return as a radio series on BBC Radio 4 in summer 2023, in the original single-guest format and with Paul Merton returning as host.

Transmissions

See also

 Room 101 (radio series)

References

External links

1994 British television series debuts
2018 British television series endings
1990s British comedy television series
2000s British comedy television series
2010s British comedy television series
BBC television comedy
BBC television talk shows
English-language television shows
Television series based on radio series
Television series by Hat Trick Productions
British television series revived after cancellation
Works based on Nineteen Eighty-Four
Television shows shot at BBC Elstree Centre
Television shows shot at Elstree Film Studios